Messam is a surname. Notable people with the surname include:

Jerome Messam (born 1985), Canadian football player
Liam Messam (born 1984), New Zealand rugby union player
Lord Messam, Jamaican mento singer
Sam Messam (born 1986), New Zealand soccer player 
Wayne Messam (born 1974), American businessman and politician